Rahula College (Sinhala: රාහුල විද්‍යාලය Rāhulaa Vidyālaya) (Tamil: ராஹுல வித்தியாலம் Rāhula vittiyālam) is a boys' school in Sri Lanka, located in Matara district. Though it was originally a private Buddhist school, now it is run by the Government of Sri Lanka as a National School. Rahula College has two sections - the Primary section, which serves students from Grade 1 to Grade 5, and the Secondary section, which serves students from Grade 6 to Grade 13.

History

In 1921, Frederick Gordon Pearce (principal of Mahinda College, Galle), D.T.W. Rajapaksha Ralahami and Sir R.S.S. Gunawardana established the "Buddhists Society". On 1 May 1923, the Buddhists Society opened a school named Parakramabhahu Vidyalaya, in a rented building on Main Street, Matara. Parakramabhahu Vidyalaya's motto was "May I be a true Buddhist". Hewabowalage Yasapala was the first student. Parakramabhahu Vidyalaya was shifted to the "Saram Mudali Walawwa" which was donated by C. A. Odiris de Silva, with the new name of "Rahula College". C.A. Odiris de Silva's second son C.A. Ariyathilake, who also donated Matara's leading girls' school Sujatha Vidyalaya, donated this school to the government.

Rahula College currently has over 3,000 students.

Principals

Primary section
Rahula Primary is located in Welegoda. It was established in 1991, at the site of the former Sudarshana Model School. There are classes from grade 1 to grade 5.

Sports 
Sports at the college include athletics, basketball, boxing, chess, cricket, rugby, soccer, swimming, volleyball, table tennis, badminton and karate.

The annual Rahula - Thomas football encounter or Battle of Golden Ensigns, is an annual football match played between Rahula College and St. Thomas' College, Matara.

In 2012 Rahula College and Dharmapala College commenced an annual match, the Battle of Golden Lions. The inaugural match was held on Uyanwatta Stadium, with Rahula College hosting the event.

Houses 
There are four student houses in the college, named after historical figures in South Asia. They are:

Ashoka :   
Named after Ashoka. The house colour is red. 
Gemunu : 
Named after Dutugamunu. The house colour is blue. 
Parakrama :  
Named after Parakramabahu I. The house colour is yellow. 
Vijaya : 
Named after Prince Vijaya. The house colour is green.

Notable alumni

Alumni of Rahula College Matara are called Rahulians. Following is a list of some notable alumni:

References

External links
 
 Rahula College Old Boys Association

1923 establishments in Ceylon
Boys' schools in Sri Lanka
Buddhist schools in Sri Lanka
Educational institutions established in 1923
National schools in Sri Lanka
Schools in Matara, Sri Lanka